Rahmer may refer to:

 Moritz Rahmer (de) (1837, Rybnik - 1904, Magdeburg), German rabbi (Magdeburg), publicist
 Sigismund Rahmer (de) (1863, Gleiwitz - 1912, Berlin), Jewish German doctor, writer, editor
 Hans Sigismund Rahmer (1924, Berlin - 2005), a German-English Liberal rabbi
 Will Rahmer (born 1969, Yonkers, New York), an American musician, vocalist

See also 
 Rohmer

German-language surnames
Jewish surnames
Yiddish-language surnames